Julie Clodius ('Juliane Friederike Henriette Clodius, née Stoelzel) was a German philosopher in the 18th century.

Born August 20, 1750, in Altenburg, Germany, and died March 3, 1805, in Dresden, Germany.

Works
Clodius wrote several articles in various periodicals.
 1784: Poems by Elisa Carter and Charlotte Smith (translation)
 1784: Biographical epilogue in: Christian August Clodius - New mixed writings (5th part)
 1806: Eduard Montrefrevil (novel, posthumously, edited together with fragments from your papers by Christian August Heinrich Clodius)

References

Sources
 Brown, Hilary. “The Reception of the Bluestockings by Eighteenth-Century German Women Writers.” Women in German Yearbook, vol. 18, 2002, pp. 111–132. JSTOR, www.jstor.org/stable/20688944. Accessed 25 May 2021.
 https://historyofwomenphilosophers.org/project/directory-of-women-philosophers/clodius-juliane-friederike-henriette-1750-1805/
 https://link.springer.com/chapter/10.1007/978-3-476-03647-6_9
 https://www.jstor.org/stable/41124358
 https://books.google.com/books?hl=en&lr=&id=9aFjAAAAcAAJ&oi=fnd&pg=PA1&dq=Julie+Clodius&ots=jFB0SdZavI&sig=7x8YiWLp5TusLfDZ1G36A2BNTfM

1750 births
1805 deaths
German women philosophers
18th-century German philosophers
18th-century German women writers
18th-century German writers
People from Altenburg